Vaman Tabaji Kardak (15 August 1922 – 15 May 2004), popularly known as Vamandada Kardak, was a Marathi poet and playwright.

References

1922 births
2004 deaths
Poets from Maharashtra
20th-century Indian dramatists and playwrights
Dramatists and playwrights from Maharashtra